The 2008 MLS Expansion Draft took place on November 26, 2008, and was a special draft for the Major League Soccer expansion team Seattle Sounders FC. They made 10 selections from a pool of players from the other 14 MLS clubs.

Format

Source

 Only one player could be selected from each team. Four of the league's 14 current teams did not have a player selected.
 Teams were allowed to protect 11 players from their 28-man rosters. Generation Adidas players were automatically protected, though players who are graduated from the program to the senior roster at the end of the 2008 season were not.
 Teams with 4 or more international players were required to protect 3 of them. If a team had 3 or fewer international players, then it was required to protect all but one.
 Any developmental players selected were required to be moved up to the senior roster for the 2009 season.

Expansion Draft Results

Team-by-team breakdown

Source

Chicago Fire

Chivas USA

Colorado Rapids

Columbus Crew

DC United

FC Dallas

Houston Dynamo

Kansas City Wizards

Los Angeles Galaxy

New England Revolution

New York Red Bulls

Real Salt Lake

San Jose Earthquakes

Toronto FC

Major League Soccer Expansion Draft
Mls Expansion Draft, 2008
MLS Expansion Draft